Andrew James Roberts (born 20 March 1974 in Dartford) is an English retired footballer who played as a midfielder.

Roberts began his career at Millwall in 1991. In 1995, he moved to Crystal Palace, where he was the club's Player of the Year in 1996. In 1998, he signed for Wimbledon, where he stayed until 2002. He had a loan spell at Norwich City in that year before returning to Millwall. During his second spell at Millwall he helped them reach the 2004 FA Cup Final, playing in their semi-final triumph over Sunderland. However he missed the final because of injury. He retired from playing in 2004, aged 30.

He was also capped five times by the England U21 team during the mid-1990s.

References

External links

1974 births
Living people
English footballers
England under-21 international footballers
Millwall F.C. players
Crystal Palace F.C. players
Wimbledon F.C. players
Norwich City F.C. players
Premier League players
Sportspeople from Dartford
Association football midfielders